Émile Louis Letord, sometimes spelled Letort, (1880–1971) was a French industrialist and pioneer aeroplane manufacturer who founded the Société d'Aviation Letord from the  Letord and Niepce workshops at Meudon, near Paris.

In 1909 Letord and Niepce built their first aircraft, a monoplane, at their workshops on rue de Paira at Meudon. In 1910 they were commissioned to build a Farman type biplane by Colonel Dorand, director of the Service technique de l'aéronautique (STAé) at Chalais-Meudon. Letord went on to build the Dorand AR.1 and 2 and the three-seater armed reconnaissance Letord 1. Letord also undertook sub-contract work for major aircraft manufacturers such as Nieuport. Some 1,500 aircraft were ordered by the Aéronautique Militaire between all the variants, with something like 300 actually produced before the end of the war.

On 17 February 1930 a fire destroyed the workshops and aircraft at Meudon, these included a twin tri-motor engined Couzinet 20 and a Couzinet 27 Arc-en-ciel  II.

Letord is associated with around 40 patent applications for improvements to aircraft design between 1919 and 1953, and some patents on other topics. Some of the applications are shared with Marcel Letort, Camille Letort and Louis Béchereau.

References

Bibliography
 La Conquete de L'Air. Un Pionier Inconnu : Emile -Louis Letord, l'Avionneur de Meudon, By Albert Henri, 1982. (The Conquest of the Air. An unknown pioneer : Emile-Louis Letord, the Aviator of Meudon.)

External links

1880 births
1971 deaths
Businesspeople from Paris
Aviation pioneers
Aviators from Paris
French aerospace engineers
Aviation history of France